The 2015 USL Premier Development League season was the 21st season of the PDL and consisted of 63 teams. The regular season began on May 2 and ended on July 19. The Michigan Bucks were the defending champions and posted the best overall record in the League; however, they were defeated by K-W United FC in the Central Conference finals. K-W United went on to win the league championship by defeating the Seattle Sounders FC U-23 1-0 in the semi-finals and in high scoring final they overcame the New York Red Bulls U-23 4-3. 63 clubs competed in the semi-professional soccer leagues.

Changes from 2014

New/Returning teams

Name Changes 
Connecticut FC Azul became AC Connecticut.
River City Rovers became Derby City Rovers.
Los Angeles Misioneros became Golden State Misioneros.
Springfield Demize became Springfield Synergy FC.
Northern Virginia Royals became D.C. United U-23.

Folding/moving 
Austin Aztex - Moved to Division III USL.
Chicago Inferno - Folded in the middle of the 2014 season on June 20, 2014 and forfeited their last 9 games.
Montreal Impact U23 - Folded
NJ-LUSO Parma - Folded
Panama City Beach Pirates - Folded
San Jose Earthquakes U23 - replaced by Burlingame Dragons FC (see above) as the Earthquakes PDL team.
Toronto Lynx - Folded its PDL team. Still active in USL Super-20 League and Super Y-League.
Vancouver Whitecaps FC U-23 - Folded
Vermont Voltage - Folded its PDL team.
Victoria Highlanders - Moved to the Pacific Coast Soccer League

Standings
2015 Premier Development League standings.

Note: The first tie-breaker in PDL standings is head-to-head results between teams tied on points, which is why some teams with inferior goal differences finish ahead in the standings.

Central Conference

Great Lakes Division

Heartland Division

Eastern Conference

Mid Atlantic Division

Northeast Division

South Atlantic Division

Southern Conference

Mid South Division

Southeast Division

Western Conference

Mountain Division

Northwest Division 
<onlyinclude>

Southwest Division

Conference Championships
Participants in the four conference championships were determined according to the specific rules of each conference. Games played prior to the conference semifinals are hosted by the team with the better record with the conference championships (semifinals and final) played at a common location. Note that the Northwest division played 12 games rather than the 14 played by the other divisions; the teams agreed to the reduced schedule in order for the division to play a balanced schedule.
Eastern Conference The 1st and 2nd place teams from the Northeast and South Atlantic divisions play each other for their division's spot in the conference semifinals. The Mid Atlantic division 1st place teams goes straight to the conference semifinals with the 2nd and 3rd place teams playing each other for the final spot. 
Southern Conference The top two teams in each division qualify to play in the conference semifinals, with the 1st place team from the Mid-South division playing the 2nd place team of the Southeast division and vice versa. 
Central Conference The top two teams from Heartland division and the 1st place team from the Great Lakes division qualify for the semifinals with the final spot coming from a playoff between the 2nd and 3rd place teams in the Great Lakes division. 
Western Conference The Mountain and Southwest divisions have a play off between the 1st and 2nd place teams for their division's spot in the conference semifinals. The Northwest division's 1st place team and the winner of a playoff between the 2nd and 3rd place teams qualify for the conference semifinals.

Eastern Conference Championship

Southern Conference Championship

Central Conference Championship

Western Conference Championship

Playoff Bracket

PDL Championship

Semi-finals

Championship

Championship MVP: Nathan Ingham (KWU)

Awards
 Most Valuable Player: Anthony Grant (SUP)
 Young (U21) Player of the Year: Timothy Mueller (LNU)
 Coach of the Year: David Dixon, (CHE)
 Defender of the Year: Dennis Castillo (POR)
 Goalkeeper of the Year: Matt Grosey (KIT)

All-League and All-Conference Teams

Eastern Conference
F: Anthony Grant (SUP) *, Nathan Regis (CHE) *, Khesanio Hall (OCN)
M: Carlos Silva (JER) *, Joe Holland (LIR), Sam Blackman (SWV)
D: Kouassi Sylvain N’Guessan (JER), Tim Schmoll (NYR), Jordan Becker (BAL), Lalas Abubakar (CHE)
G: Matt Williams (GPS)

Central Conference
F: James Pucci (LON), Ben Polk (KWU), David Goldsmith (MIB)
M: Calvin Rezende (MIB), Sergio Camargo (KWU), Jacob Cawsey (STL), Moses Danto (WSA)
D: Oyvind Alseth (KWU), Zach Carroll (MIB), Andrew Herr (PIT)
G: Yuta Nomura (SPS)

Western Conference
F: Timothy Mueller (LNU) *, Guillermo Delgado (SEA), Pedro Espindola (TUC)
M: Todd Wharton (POR) *, Nick Hamer (KIT), Renato Bustamante (FRE)
D: Dennis Castillo (POR) *, Jonathan Campbell (SEA) *, Cory Keitz (KIT), Kalem Scott (TUC)
G: Matt Grosey (KIT) *

Southern Conference
F: George Kelley (HOU), Jason Collister (IMG), Paulo Vaz (FLA)
M: Sergio Royo (MIS) *, Billal Qsiyer (SWF), Lewis Hilton (OCA)
D: Hugo Leroux (MIA) *, Walker Hume (MIO), Isaac Sanchez (MIO) *, Paco Craig (OCA)
G: Michael Yantz (SWF)

* denotes All-League player

References

USL League Two seasons